Mossane is a 1996 Senegalese drama film directed by Safi Faye. It was screened in the Un Certain Regard section at the 1996 Cannes Film Festival. Unlike some of Faye's earlier films which use a documentary style, Mossane is purely fictional.

Plot
Mossane (Magou Seck) is a beautiful 14-year-old girl from a rural Serer village, beloved by many including her own brother and Fara, a poor university student. Although she has long been promised in marriage to the wealthy Diogaye, Mossane defies her parents' wishes and falls in love with Fara. On her wedding day, she refuses to marry Diogaye and tragedy ensues.

Cast
 Abou Camara as Oncle Baak
 Moussa Cissé
 Mbaye Diagne
 Alpha Diouf as Ngor
 Alioune Konaré as Fara
 Daouda Lam
 Ibou N'Dong
 Isseu Niang as Mere Mingue Diouf
 Magou Seck as Mossane
 Medoune Seck
 Guèye Seynabou
 Moustapha Yade as Samba

References

External links

1996 films
1996 drama films
Films directed by Safi Faye
Wolof-language films
Films about the Serer people
Films scored by Yandé Codou Sène
Senegalese drama films